Alberto Manuel Domínguez Rivas (born 11 February 1988), known simply as Alberto, is a Spanish footballer who plays as a goalkeeper for Coruxo FC.

Club career
Born in Santiago de Compostela, Galicia, Alberto graduated from Deportivo de La Coruña's youth setup, and made his senior debut while on loan at local club Montañeros CF. He returned to the Estadio Riazor in summer 2008, being immediately assigned to the reserves in the Segunda División B.

In June 2009, Alberto signed for SD Compostela in the same league, but after appearing sparingly he agreed to a deal at Coruxo FC of the same division in August 2010. On 3 July 2012 he joined another reserve team, Getafe CF B, occasionally being called up to the main squad.

On 18 July 2013, Alberto moved to Albacete Balompié also of the third division. Initially a backup to Francisco Dorronsoro, he became first-choice in mid-February 2014 and appeared in 18 games during the season (play-offs included), as the club returned to Segunda División after a three-year absence.

Alberto played his first match as a professional on 24 August 2014, starting in a 2–3 home loss against AD Alcorcón. He lost his importance in the squad due to the arrival of Diego Rivas as well as injury problems, and was released at the end of the campaign.

On 3 August 2015, Alberto signed with third-tier SD Ponferradina.

Career statistics

Club

References

External links

1988 births
Living people
Spanish footballers
Footballers from Santiago de Compostela
Association football goalkeepers
Segunda División players
Segunda División B players
Tercera División players
Segunda Federación players
Deportivo Fabril players
SD Compostela footballers
Coruxo FC players
Getafe CF B players
Albacete Balompié players
SD Ponferradina players